The Belgrave Lantern Festival (Belgrave Lantern Parade) is an annual celebration of the winter solstice, through community and creativity with a display of hundreds of homemade lanterns. The event takes place in the main street of Belgrave from around 5pm - 7:30pm and attracts thousands of visitors. There are many lantern making workshops held before the parade from around March at the Belgrave Library and other places such as primary schools. The parade is open for everyone who has brought a lantern, and there are entertainers such as belly dancers, fire twirlers and the Ruccis Circus that perform before the parade begins. The lanterns that are brought are a range of sizes, with some so big their owners have to wear them. People start arriving in Belgrave from about 4 pm where they can enjoy bands, choirs and food stalls. The people wishing to take part in the actual parade part of the night are asked to gather in Hayes car park by 5 pm. After the parade, Belgrave Library hosts storytime for children at 7 pm with other activities as well such as face painting There are some lanterns that are remembered by the annual parade-goers such as a Dalek and a TARDIS from the british television show Doctor Who. Some other memorable ones are the fauna inspired lanterns such as the cockatoo, dragonfly and frog.

See also 

 Belgrave, Victoria
 Belgrave railway line
 Belgrave travel guide

References

Culture of Melbourne
Festivals in Melbourne
Light festivals